Jhony Moisés Galli Moreira (born 19 March 1990) is a Uruguayan footballer who plays as a midfielder for Deportivo Municipal in the Peru Peruvian Primera División.

Career

Club career
In January 2020, Galli joined Colombian Categoría Primera A club Once Caldas.

References

External links

1990 births
Living people
Uruguayan footballers
Uruguayan expatriate footballers
Miramar Misiones players
Villa Teresa players
Rampla Juniors players
Once Caldas footballers
Deportivo Municipal footballers
Uruguayan Primera División players
Uruguayan Segunda División players
Categoría Primera A players
Peruvian Segunda División players
Association football midfielders
Uruguayan expatriate sportspeople in Colombia
Uruguayan expatriate sportspeople in Peru
Expatriate footballers in Colombia
Expatriate footballers in Peru